Roman Petrík (born 29 July 1994) is a Slovak professional ice hockey goaltender for HKM Zvolen of the Slovak Extraliga.

Petrík made his professional debut for HKM Zvolen during the 2014–15 season. He played 13 games for Zvolen before moving to HK 36 Skalica of the Slovak 1. Liga during the 2016–17 season. On April 18, 2018, Petrík returned to the Tipsport Liga and signed with HC 07 Detva. On February 18, 2020, Petrík returned to HKM Zvolen for the remainder of the 2019–20 season. which would eventually be curtailed prematurely due to the COVID-19 pandemic.

Career statistics

Regular season and playoffs

References

External links

1994 births
Living people
HC 07 Detva players
HK 36 Skalica players
Slovak ice hockey goaltenders
Sportspeople from Zvolen
HKM Zvolen players
HC 21 Prešov players